International University may refer to:

 Akita International University
 Alliant International University, main campus in San Diego, California, US
 Azerbaijan International University
 Bronte International University
 Columbia International University
 Daffodil International University
 Dubrovnik International University
 Eurasia International University
 Florida International University
 Ho Chi Minh City International University
 Hope International University
 Imam Khomeini International University
 International University, Cambodia
 International University, Indonesia
 International University in Geneva
 International University of Batam
 International University of Business Agriculture and Technology
 International University of Chabahar
 International University of Japan
 International University of Monaco
 International University of Novi Pazar
 International University Vienna
 International University of Kyrgyzstan
 Isles Internationale Université (European Union)
 Jones International University
 Kyiv International University
 Latin American Faculty of Social Sciences
 LCC International University
 Lebanese International University
 Maharishi International University, renamed in 1995 to Maharishi University of Management
 Manarat International University
 Marycrest International University
 Misr International University
 Mongolia International University
 Pacific International University
 Riphah International University
 Salem International University
 Schiller International University
 Sylhet International University
 Symbiosis International University
 Texas A&M International University
 Tokyo International University
 United International University
 United States International University, San Diego, California (merged into Alliant International University in 2001)
 University for International Integration of the Afro-Brazilian Lusophony
 Vision International University
 Washington International University
 Webber International University
 Western International University

International Islamic University 

 International Islamic University Malaysia
 Sultan Abdul Halim Mu'adzam Shah International Islamic University, Malaysia
 Selangor International Islamic University, Malaysia
 International Islamic University, Islamabad
 International Islamic University, Chittagong
 Islamic University of Technology, Bangladesh

See also
International Islamic University (disambiguation)
American International University (disambiguation)
National University (disambiguation)
International University Liaison Indonesia - IULI